The Sofitel Cairo Nile El Gezirah Hotel is a skyscraper hotel located in Cairo, Egypt. The 27-story building was completed in 1984 as the El Gezirah Sheraton Hotel & Towers. The modernist building is located on Sharia el Orman, and contains 4 large conference rooms. The discernible v-shaped support beams of the structure evoke those at the Dizengoff Center in Tel Aviv.

See also
Skyscraper design and construction
List of tallest buildings in Cairo

References

1984 establishments in Egypt
Hotels in Cairo
Hotel buildings completed in 1984